Morgan's Ferry is a 2001 American crime drama film starring Billy Zane, Henry Rollins, Kelly McGillis, Roscoe Lee Browne, Johnny Galecki and Muse Watson, directed by Sam Pillsbury.

Plot
A trio of escaped criminals hide out in a woman's home as they wait to catch a ferry.

References

External links

2001 films
2001 crime drama films
2001 independent films
American crime drama films
American independent films
Films shot in North Carolina
Films directed by Sam Pillsbury
2000s English-language films
2000s American films